Rocky Lee Barton (July 28, 1956 – July 12, 2006) was executed by the State of Ohio on July 12, 2006 for the murder of his wife, 43-year-old Kimbirli Jo Barton, at their home in Waynesville, Ohio. Convicted on October 10, 2003, Barton spent almost three years on death row.

Kimbirli and Barton had gotten in a domestic dispute the morning of January 16, 2003, and she was returning home to gather her belongings in order to move out, when Barton ambushed her by making sure the gate to the driveway was locked behind her. Barton then appeared and shot Kimbirli once in the shoulder, then in the back with a shotgun. Barton's uncle and 17-year-old daughter witnessed the shooting. At trial, Barton admitted to the murder and told the jury that he deserved to die.

Rocky Barton also attempted to take his own life, but only succeeded in blowing off the lower half of his face. The State paid for his facial surgeries, which left him unrecognizable and required wearing a partial mask on his face. While awaiting trial, Rocky Barton was held in the Warren County Jail in Lebanon, Ohio. Due to the mask, he was referred to as "Darth Vader." At one time in particular, Rocky Barton and Kimberli's ex-husband were incarcerated at the Warren County Jail at the same time. The two were never held in the same pod.

Two months after his sentence, Barton filed his notice of direct appeal to the Ohio Supreme Court, but on October 4, 2004, Barton filed a pro se motion to withdraw appeal and waive counsel.  The Ohio Supreme Court held oral argument in September 2005 and in October 2005 Barton filed another pro se motion to waive all review of his conviction.

He also opted not to apply for executive clemency.

Barton had worked as a construction laborer and horse trainer and had served time in prison before the murder. He admitted his parents' divorce, drug and alcohol use, as well as problems with depression and anxiety, had influenced his life.

See also 
 Capital punishment in Ohio
 Capital punishment in the United States
 List of people executed in Ohio
 List of people executed in the United States in 2006

References

External links 
  Death Row interview
 Rocky Lee Barton - Executed July 12, 2006 10:27 a.m. by Lethal Injection in Ohio

1956 births
2006 deaths
2003 murders in the United States
21st-century executions by Ohio
American people executed for murder
People executed by Ohio by lethal injection
People from Butler County, Ohio
People from Waynesville, Ohio
Executed people from Ohio
People convicted of murder by Ohio
21st-century executions of American people